Mondo Nuevo may refer to: 

 Mundo Nuevo (1968–1971), literary magazine founded by Emir Rodríguez Monegal
 Mundo Nuevo (Junín district), a district of Junín Department, Mendoza, Argentina
 Mundo Nuevo (Rivadavia district), a district of Rivadavia Department, Mendoza, Argentina

See also

 Los Valientes del Mundo Nuevo, a 2007 garage rock album by Black Lips